Rogério Conceição do Rosário (born 1 February 1991), simply known as Thuram, is a Brazilian professional footballer who plays as a forward for Turkish club Pendikspor.

References

1991 births
Living people
Association football forwards
Brazilian footballers
Club Athletico Paranaense players
Esporte Clube Novo Hamburgo players
Associação Chapecoense de Futebol players
Esporte Clube Bahia players
Aris Limassol FC players
Atlético Monte Azul players
Apollon Limassol FC players
PAE Kerkyra players
PAS Lamia 1964 players
Konyaspor footballers
Tuzlaspor players
Ionikos F.C. players
Pendikspor footballers
Cypriot First Division players
Super League Greece players
Süper Lig players
TFF First League players
Brazilian expatriate footballers
Brazilian expatriate sportspeople in Cyprus
Expatriate footballers in Cyprus
Brazilian expatriate sportspeople in Greece
Expatriate footballers in Greece
Brazilian expatriate sportspeople in Turkey
Expatriate footballers in Turkey